Bududa is a town in the Eastern Region of Uganda. It is the main municipal, administrative, and commercial center of Bududa District.

Location
The town is located within Mount Elgon National Park. The geographical coordinates of Bududa Town Council are 01°00'36.0"N, 34°19'54.0"E (Latitude:1.010011; Longitude:34.331663).

Population
In 2015, the Uganda Bureau of Statistics (UBOS) estimated the population at of Bududa Town Council at 7,100 people. In 2020, the population agency estimated the mid-year population of the town at 8,700 inhabitants, of whom 4,400 (50.6 percent) were males and 4,300 (49.4 percent) were females. UBOS calculated that the population of the town increased at an average rate of 4.2 percent annually between 2015 and 2020.

Overview
In the 21st century, a number of factors have converged to make the town of Bududa and the surrounding countryside prone to landslides, leading to loss of life and property.

Some of those factors include the volcanic nature of the soils, the steep terrain and the high reproductive rate of the population, putting pressure on the available habitable land. UBOS calculated the average annual growth rate of the population of Bududa District at 4.5 percent annually, on average, between 2014 and 2020. Bududa Town Council was growing faster at 4.6 percent annually, on average, between 2015 and 2020. When many people crowd on the side of a mountain, with loose soils and a lot of rain, catastrophic events may happen.

Another factor in the persistence of these tragedies is the refusal of large number of residents to relocate away from the vulnerable areas due to lack of proper understanding, political influence and miscalculation.

Notable people
Agnes Nandutu, State Minister for Karamoja and Women's Representative for Bududa District in the 11th Parliament (2021–2026)
 Eng Abner Nangwale, Minister of Works from 1980–1985

See also
Bagisu
Lugisu

References

External links
 Communities Near Bududa Hit By Fatal Landslides in March 2010
 Bududa Vocational Academy

Populated places in Eastern Region, Uganda
Bududa District
Bugisu sub-region